Cass County Court House, Jail, and Sheriff's House is a property in Fargo, North Dakota that was listed on the National Register of Historic Places in 1983.

It was built in 1904 in Late 19th and 20th Century Revivals architecture style, and was designed by architect Charles E. Bell.

Its buildings served historically as a courthouse, as a correctional facility, and as a single dwelling.

The courthouse "is significant architecturally as Fargo's premier example of Renaissance Revival style architecture".

The property was covered in a study of North Dakota county courthouses.

References

Jails on the National Register of Historic Places in North Dakota
Buildings and structures in Fargo, North Dakota
Courthouses on the National Register of Historic Places in North Dakota
Houses on the National Register of Historic Places in North Dakota
County courthouses in North Dakota
National Register of Historic Places in Cass County, North Dakota
Houses in Fargo, North Dakota
1904 establishments in North Dakota
Renaissance Revival architecture in North Dakota